Ringgenbach is a river of Baden-Württemberg, Germany. It rises near the Walbertsweiler hamlet within the municipality of Wald, flowing north through the municipality of Meßkirch hamlets of Dietershofen and then Ringgenbach, before reaching a confluence into the Ablach, east of the main district of Meßkirch.

See also

List of rivers of Baden-Württemberg

Rivers of Baden-Württemberg
Rivers of Germany

References